Al-Bahah Province is a province of Saudi Arabia. It is located in the southwestern part of the Hejazi region. It has an area of 9,921 km2, and a population of 476,172 (2017). Its capital is Al Bahah. The region includes Al-Baḥah City, Al-Mikhwah and Baljorashi. Baljorashi has a famous traditional market known as Sūq as-Sabt, which translates to English as "Saturday market". The Baljorashi market is very old and its exact age is unknown. This market opens after the Fajr prayer, or around 5 A.M. local time. The market closes around noon. People come from all over the region to buy and sell handmade goods. Other cities in the region include Baljourashi, Al-Mikhwah, Rahwat Albar and Sabt Alalaya. Al-Baḥah region is the home of two Azd tribes, the Ghamid and the Zahran.

Etymology
The word al-Baḥah (or Baḥah without al which is equivalent to "the" in English) has many meanings; it means water and the maximum of it, the courtyard of a house, the high and abundant palm tree. In tales it refers to an extremely deep bottomless well in al-Zafir fortress. It means "open space", "water" and "abundant palm tree" and the "midline of a road".

Governors
 Saud bin Abdulrahman bin Turki Al Sudairi (1962–1977)
 Ibrahim bin Abdulaziz Al Ibrahim (1977–1987)
 Muhammed bin Saud Al Saud (1987–2010)
 Mishari bin Saud bin Abdulaziz Al Saud (28 August 2010 – 22 April 2017)
 Hussam bin Saud bin Abdulaziz Al Saud (22 April 2017 – present)

Geography

Al-Baḥah is the name of the province as well its main city, situated in the northwestern part of Ghamed territory. The region is formed of mountains, hills, plains, valleys and desert stretches. This region is situated in the Hejaz, between longitudes 41/42 E and latitudes 19/20 N. The region covers an area about 36,000 km2.

Major cities
 Al Bahah
 Baljurashi
 Al-Mandaq
 Al-Mikhwah
 Al-Aqeeq

Topography

The region is divided by huge rocky steeps into two main sectors. To the west is a coastal plain, the Tihamah.

Population
A genealogist has confirmed that the majority of the population of Al-Baḥah are descended from the Azad Shenou`a tribe which emigrated from the south of the Hejaz in the Arabian peninsula, following some historical natural events.

Al-Azad is an Arab tribe which is divided into 24 tribes derived from four stocks: Azad Shenou`a, Azad Al Sarat, Azad Ghassan and Azad Aman. Al-Azad (or al-Assad the Lion) was the title given to Darda`e bin al-Ghot bin Nabt bin Malik bin Nassr al-Azad. Kaab bin al-Harith had seven children including Ghamed, who is Amr bin Abdullah bin Kaab. Zahran bin al-Harith had six children, including Abdullah bin Zahran who is the great grandfather of the Zahran tribe. The population of the region now is about 500,000. Many have moved to major metropolitan areas for better living and education.

Climate
The variation in topography influences the climate of the region. Al-Sarat area is exposed to the formation of clouds and fog, and this often happens in winter because of air masses coming from the Red Sea, accompanied by thunderstorms. In spring and summer the climate is mild and pleasant. The Tihama is an undulating coastal plain, hot in summer, warm in spring and mild in winter. The climate in general falls in the arid zone.

Social structure
The social life of the inhabitants of the region is based on Sunni Islam, in addition to the well established Arab customs and tradition. Each tribe division or subdivision has its own Shaykh (head).

See also
 Middle East
 Arabian Peninsula
 Sarat Mountains
 South Arabia

References

 
Provinces of Saudi Arabia